Willem Maurits Bruijninck (also Bruyninck, Bruijnink, Bruinink, Bruninck, etc.)  (24 January 1689 Lichtenvoorde - ?) was the 25th Governor of Ceylon during the Dutch period in Ceylon. He was appointed on 12 March 1740 and was Governor until 8 January 1742. He was succeeded by Daniel Overbeek.

Bruijninck was the oldest son of Wilhelmina Verwitt and Peter Bruijninck, voogd (custodian/governor) of Lichtenvoorde for the lord of Bronckhorst and Borculo. Willem Maurits joined the Dutch East India Company and had risen to opperkoopman ("upper-merchant") before 1735. From 1735 to 1737 he was Governor of the Sumatran West Coast and commissary of the silver and gold mines of Salida near Padang. He was married to Hermina Helena Tolling.

References

1689 births
Year of death unknown
18th-century Dutch people
Dutch expatriates in Sri Lanka
Governors of Dutch Ceylon
People from Lichtenvoorde
Dutch East India Company people